Coeliades is a genus of large skipper butterflies (family Hesperiidae) found in Subsaharan Africa. They are commonly known as policemen.

Species
Listed alphabetically.
 Coeliades aeschylus (Plötz, 1884) – Senegal blue policeman
 Coeliades anchises (Gerstaecker, 1871) – one pip policeman
 Coeliades bixana Evans, 1940 – dark blue policeman
 Coeliades bocagii (Sharpe, 1893)
 Coeliades chalybe (Westwood, 1852) – blue policeman
 Coeliades ernesti (Grandidier, 1867)
 Coeliades fervida (Butler, 1880)
 Coeliades fidia Evans, 1937
 Coeliades forestan (Stoll, [1782]) – striped policeman
 Coeliades hanno (Plötz, 1879) – western policeman,  three pip policeman
 Coeliades keithloa (Wallengren, 1857) – red tab policeman
 Coeliades libeon (Druce, 1875) – spotless policeman
 Coeliades lorenzo Evans, 1947 – Lorenzo red tab policeman
 Coeliades pisistratus (Fabricius, 1793) – two pip policeman
 Coeliades rama Evans, 1937
 Coeliades ramanatek (Boisduval, 1833)
 Coeliades sejuncta (Mabille & Vuillot, 1891) – coast policeman, ochreous-banded policeman

References

 Seitz, A. Die Gross-Schmetterlinge der Erde 13: Die Afrikanischen Tagfalter. Plate XIII 75

Coeliadinae
Hesperiidae genera
Taxa named by Jacob Hübner